Central Coast Zoo & The Amazement Farm & Fun Park are conjoined privately owned zoos located at Wyong Creek, New South Wales, Australia, while the latter has been open for years, the 'Central Coast Zoo' is currently only open to private tours through phone-call or email bookings, however the zoo is expected to formally open officially to public visitation in 2023. Expected to be amongst the most popular animals to visitors are a pride of six (3 female & 3 male) former circus-kept African lions.

Animals

The species kept at the 'Central Coast Zoo' are listed below:
 African lion
 Aldabra giant tortoise
 American alligator
 Barbary sheep
 Blackbuck
 Blue-and-gold macaw
 Brown capuchin
 Burmese python
 Canada goose
 Capybara
 Common marmoset
 Corn snake
 Dromedary camel
 Egyptian goose
 Elongated tortoise
 Fennec fox
 Glossy ibis
 Green iguana
 Green-winged macaw
 Grey parrot
 Hermann's tortoise
 Leopard tortoise
 Meerkat
 Mute swan
 Ostrich
 Paradise shelduck
 Red-fronted macaw
 Red-rumped agouti
 Red-tailed boa
 Rhesus macaque
 Rhinoceros iguana
 Scarlet macaw
 Serval
 Yellow-headed parrot

The species kept at 'The Amazement Farm & Fun Park' are listed below:
 Agile wallaby
 Alexandrine parrot
 Black swan
 Bourke's parrot
 Cape Barren goose
 Central bearded dragon
 Coastal carpet python
 Common wombat
 Derbyan parakeet
 Diamond python
 Domestic donkey
 Domestic goat
 Domestic horse
 Domestic sheep
 Eastern common ringtail possum
 Eastern grey kangaroo
 Emu
 Fallow deer
 Galah
 Koi
 Llama
 Rainbow lorikeet
 Red deer
 Red-tailed black cockatoo
 Rufous bettong
 Saltwater crocodile
 Short-beaked echidna
 Southern cassowary
 Sulphur-crested cockatoo
 Tammar wallaby
 Tawny frogmouth

References

External links
 http://www.centralcoastzoo.com.au/ (official website: currently being developed)
 https://www.facebook.com/Central.Coast.Zoo/ (current website in use)

Zoos in New South Wales
Central Coast (New South Wales)
2021 establishments in Australia
Zoos established in 2021